Annika Kukkonen (born 12 April 1990) is a Finnish football midfielder who played for Djurgården of Sweden's Damallsvenskan. She previously played for HJK, LdB FC Malmö, KIF Örebro and Sunnanå SK. She has been a member of the Finnish national team since February 2010.

In June 2013 Kukkonen was named in national coach Andrée Jeglertz's Finland squad for UEFA Women's Euro 2013.

Kukkonen left Sunnanå after their 2013 Damallsvenskan campaign ended in relegation. She joined Örebro in February 2014.

References

External links
 

1990 births
Living people
Finnish women's footballers
Finnish expatriate footballers
Expatriate women's footballers in Sweden
Damallsvenskan players
Finland women's international footballers
FC Rosengård players
Djurgårdens IF Fotboll (women) players
KIF Örebro DFF players
Helsingin Jalkapalloklubi (women) players
Kansallinen Liiga players
Sunnanå SK players
Women's association football midfielders
Footballers from Helsinki
21st-century Finnish women